Mylothris arabicus is a butterfly in the family Pieridae. It is found in south-western Yemen and Saudi Arabia (up to 'Asir).

Egg clusters were found Loranthus species, which is probably the food plant.

References

Butterflies described in 1954
Pierini